Sun Structures is the debut studio album by English psychedelic rock band Temples. It was released on 5 February 2014 by Heavenly Recordings. The building shown on the album cover is the Rushton Triangular Lodge near Rushton, Northamptonshire. The song "Keep in the Dark" is played over the closing credits to the 2015 thriller film The Gift.

Singles
"Shelter Song" was sent to US modern rock radio by Fat Possum Records on 15 April 2014.

Track listing

Personnel
Credits adapted from the liner notes of Sun Structures.

Temples
 James Bagshaw – lead vocals, lead guitar, production ; mixing 
 Thomas Walmsley – bass, backing vocals

Additional personnel
 Cerne Canning – management
 Thomas Caslin – design, layout
 Zoë Maxwell – artwork, photography
 Claudius Mittendorfer – mixing 
 James Sandom – management
 Abbie Stephens – artwork, photography
 Noel Summerville – mastering

Charts

Release history

References

2014 debut albums
Heavenly Recordings albums
Temples (band) albums